The Burnt mound in Fox Hollies Park is a Bronze Age burnt mound archaeological feature located in Fox Hollies Park, in the Fox Hollies area of south Birmingham. It is a Scheduled Ancient Monument, having been scheduled by English Heritage (now Historic England) on 24 July 2002. It consists of an oval mound about 0.3m tall and about 14m by 9m in length. As of 2019 there are no plaques, explanatory boards or indeed any other features in the park to indicate its existence, and it is currently covered in plant growth.

Gallery

See also 
 Scheduled monuments in Birmingham

References

Archaeological sites in the West Midlands (county)
Scheduled monuments in the West Midlands (county)
Birmingham, West Midlands
Barrows in the United Kingdom